Bulyakbashevo (Büläkbaş) is a rural locality (a village) in Durasovsky Selsoviet, Chishminsky District, Bashkortostan, Russia. The population was 161 as of 2010. There are 4 streets.

Geography 
Bulyakbashevo is located 31 km south of Chishmy (the district's administrative centre) by road. Chuvalkipovo is the nearest rural locality.

References 

Rural localities in Chishminsky District